Patrizia Medail (born 15 November 1945) is an Italian alpine skier. She competed in the women's giant slalom at the 1964 Winter Olympics.

References

1945 births
Living people
Italian female alpine skiers
Olympic alpine skiers of Italy
Alpine skiers at the 1964 Winter Olympics
Sportspeople from Bologna